My Brother Jonathan is a 1948 British drama film directed by Harold French and starring Michael Denison, Dulcie Gray, Ronald Howard and Beatrice Campbell. It is adapted from the 1930 novel My Brother Jonathan by Francis Brett Young, later turned into a television series of the same title.

The film was part of an attempt to relaunch major production by ABPC following the Second World War. It was made at Elstree Studios and Welwyn Studios, with location shooting taking place at Aston Rowant railway station in Oxfordshire. The sets were designed by the art director Douglas Daniels.

Plot 
The story revolves around the life of Jonathan Dakers (Denison), a small-town doctor. He is training to be a surgeon when his father dies. Due to the resulting financial problems, he cannot continue his training. The story goes briefly into flashback: to 1900. Johnathan and his brother go to a new private school. As soon as they arrive they join a game of cricket, where a young girl Edith (Edie) keeps the score.

We return to the death of his father (in a car accident). It is revealed that the father had misspent Jonathan's inheritance (which was in trust). Jonathan promises his brother Harold that he will still be able to finish his degree at Cambridge University.

He buys a share in Dr. Hammond's general practice in Wednesford, a poor foundry town in the north. He maintains a relationship with Edie, writing to her as she winters in Monte Carlo on the English Riviera. The local cottage hospital refuses him permission to bring his patients there and as he is not a Fellow of the Royal College of Surgeons also refuse him permission to operate.

Harold tells Jonathan that he loves Edie and is going to marry her. They celebrate together on New Year's Eve 1913/14. Jonathan moves his affections from Edie to Rachel, his assistant. Harold (Hal) joins up at the start of the First World War. He is killed leaving Edie pregnant but unmarried so Jonathan returns to her and marries her to preserve respectability.

When Dakers notes that many patients have been injured in industrial accidents at the foundry, he comes into conflict with its owner Sir Joseph Higgins, and the owner's son-in-law Dr. Craig, who owns the town's competing medical practice. He writes a report criticising the condition of the foundry and buildings the workers live in but Craig, who is also the local Health Officer, deliberately mislays it.

When Dakers performs a life saving tracheotomy on a child with diphtheria, and takes the child to the cottage hospital, he is charged with misconduct, as the hospital charter precludes infectious cases. He is asked to attend a medical tribunal. Jonathan explains he had no choice in order to save the child. He is charged with not reporting a case of diphtheria and operating without permission. Dakers publicly accuses the medical authorities of suppressing health issues in the town and not serving the town. Dakers suggest public subscription to support medical treatment of the poor. The public are very much behind Dakers.

They decide to change the operation of the hospital. The corrupt officials (Higgins and Dr. Craig) resign. As the meeting concludes a siren sounds... there is a big fire at one of the foundries. Craig is injured and Jonathan operates on him and saves his life.

Dr. Hammond meanwhile serves at the birth of Edie's son. However Edie dies soon after, first telling Jonathan to be happy with Rachel.

The story jumps to 1939. Jonathan and Rachel are married. Edie's son is fully grown and in army uniform.

Cast
Jonathan Dakers – Michael Denison
Rachel Hammond – Dulcie Gray
Harold (Hal) Dakers – Ronald Howard
Dr. Craig – Stephen Murray
Mrs. Dakers – Mary Clare
Dr. John Hammond – Finlay Currie
Edith (Edie) Martyn – Beatrice Campbell
Mrs. Hodgkiss – Beatrice Varley
Eugene Dakers (his father) – James Robertson Justice
Tom Morse – James Hayter
Connie – Jessica Spencer
Wilburn – John Salew
Tony Dakers, Edie's son – Pete Murray
Bagley – Wylie Watson
Mrs. Perry – Hilda Bayley
Lily Rudge – Josephine Stuart
Mr. Martyn – Stuart Lindsell
Sir Joseph Higgins – Arthur Young

Production
Director Harold French said he did not pick Michael Denison but he approved him.

Reception

Box Office
The film was a big hit on release, being the third most popular movie at the British box office in 1948. It led to Michael Denison being voted the 6th most popular British star. According to Kinematograph Weekly the 'biggest winner' at the box office in 1948 Britain was The Best Years of Our Lives with Spring in Park Lane being the best British film and "runners up" being It Always Rains on Sunday, My Brother Jonathan, Road to Rio, Miranda, An Ideal Husband, Naked City, The Red Shoes, Green Dolphin Street, Forever Amber, Life with Father, The Weaker Sex, Oliver Twist, The Fallen Idol and The Winslow Boy.

Michael Balcon later claimed the film earned £1,041,000 at the UK box office of which £416,000 went on the entertainment tax, £375,000 went to exhibitors and £57,000 to the distributors, meaning the makers of the film did not recover their costs from the UK release.

In 1985 My Brother Jonathan was adapted into a British television series starring Daniel Day-Lewis and Barbara Kellerman.

References

External links

My Brother Jonathan at New York Times
Review of film at Variety

1948 films
1948 drama films
British drama films
Medical-themed films
1940s English-language films
Films directed by Harold French
Films based on British novels
British black-and-white films
Films set in England
Films shot at Associated British Studios
Films shot at Welwyn Studios
1940s British films